Joseph Fogerty Sr. was an Irish builder and architect active in nineteenth-century Limerick. Born in Limerick into a family of builders, he was the father of Robert Fogerty and George J. Fogerty; brother of John Fogerty (engineer), uncle of engineer and novelist Joseph Fogerty of London and architect William Fogerty of Dublin, and great uncle of architect John Frederick Fogerty.   He designed and built the Theatre Royal, Limerick, Henry Street.   From the 1870s until his death, he was partners with his son Robert in the firm Joseph Fogerty & Son.

Works
1834 Holy Trinity Church of Ireland Church, Limerick
1841 Theatre Royale, Limerick
1856 Harmony Row Presbyterian Church, Ennis, Co. Clare

References

Irish engineers
Architects from Limerick (city)
Irish ecclesiastical architects
1887 deaths
19th-century Irish people
Year of birth missing